Karl Bähre (11 April 1899 – 14 January 1960) was a German water polo player who competed in the 1928 Summer Olympics. He was part of the German team which won the gold medal. He played all three matches and scored eight goals.

See also
 Germany men's Olympic water polo team records and statistics
 List of Olympic champions in men's water polo
 List of Olympic medalists in water polo (men)

References

External links
 

1899 births
1960 deaths
German male water polo players
Water polo players at the 1928 Summer Olympics
Olympic water polo players of Germany
Olympic gold medalists for Germany
Olympic medalists in water polo
Medalists at the 1928 Summer Olympics